Alexis Ramos (born 13 April 1989) is an Argentine footballer.

Club career
Born in San Carlos de Bolívar, Ramos began playing football in the youth system of local side Aldosivi. He played with the club's senior side for one and one-half seasons before embarking on an extended spell in the Argentine regional leagues with Concepción Fútbol Club, Ferro Carril Oeste de General Pico, Gimnasia y Esgrima de Concepción del Uruguay, Estudiantes de Río Cuarto, Independiente de Chivilcoy, General Paz Juniors and Huracán de Goya.

After a spell playing for A.D. Isidro Metapán in El Salvador, Ramos played for El Tanque Sisley in the 2017 Uruguayan Primera División. After El Tanque Sisley withdrew from the 2018 league, he joined Venezuelan Primera División side Metropolitanos F.C.

Alexis Ramos made his debut in Cambodia League in 2019 For Angkor Tiger.

References

External links
 
Profile at BDFA.com.ar

Living people
1989 births
Argentine footballers
Argentine expatriate footballers
Aldosivi footballers
Gimnasia y Esgrima de Concepción del Uruguay footballers
Concepción Fútbol Club players
Estudiantes de Río Cuarto footballers
General Paz Juniors footballers
A.D. Isidro Metapán footballers
El Tanque Sisley players
Metropolitanos FC players
C.D. Técnico Universitario footballers
Gudja United F.C. players
Angkor Tiger FC players
Municipal Pérez Zeledón footballers
Torneo Argentino A players
Torneo Argentino B players
Liga FPD players
Uruguayan Primera División players
Venezuelan Primera División players
Association football forwards
Argentine expatriate sportspeople in Ecuador
Argentine expatriate sportspeople in El Salvador
Argentine expatriate sportspeople in Uruguay
Argentine expatriate sportspeople in Venezuela
Argentine expatriate sportspeople in Malta
Argentine expatriate sportspeople in Costa Rica
Expatriate footballers in Ecuador
Expatriate footballers in El Salvador
Expatriate footballers in Uruguay
Expatriate footballers in Venezuela
Expatriate footballers in Cambodia
Expatriate footballers in Malta
Expatriate footballers in Costa Rica
Sportspeople from Buenos Aires Province